Husan Bano Rakhshani is a Pakistani politician who was a member of the Provincial Assembly of Balochistan, from May 2013 to May 2018.

Education
Rakhshani holds a Master of Arts degree.

Political career
In December 2010, Rakhshani joined the Provincial Cabinet of Balochistan as adviser to Chief Minister for planning and development.

Rakhshani was elected to the Provincial Assembly of Balochistan as a candidate of Jamiat Ulema-e Islam (F) on a reserved seat for women in 2013 Pakistani general election.

References

Living people
Jamiat Ulema-e-Islam (F) politicians
Balochistan MPAs 2013–2018
Year of birth missing (living people)